The creole wrasse (Clepticus parrae) is a species of wrasse native to the western Atlantic Ocean.

Description
The creole wrasse is a small wrasse, with males reaching around 30 cm (1 ft) in length, while females are smaller. It has a typical wrasse shape. Like many wrasse, it changes colour markedly during its lifetime, with juveniles being almost completely violet-purple. As it matures, it develops a yellow patch on the rear part of its body.

Distribution
The species is found throughout the tropical waters of the western Atlantic Ocean from Florida to Brazil, including Bermuda Islands, the Caribbean Sea, and the Gulf of Mexico.

Ecology
This wrasse lives in groups, aggregating on coral reef slopes, down to around 100 m (330 ft) in depth. These groups feed on plankton, including small jellyfish, pteropods, pelagic tunicates, and invertebrate larvae. The creole wrasse is active by day, and at night it retreats alone to a rocky crevice in the reef to sleep.

Reproduction
The creole wrasse is a protogynous hermaphrodite; the largest fish in a group is a dominant breeding male, while smaller fish remain female. If the dominant male dies, the largest female changes sex. The mature males congregate at leks to breed, at which they display and are approached by females before mating with them.

Taxonomy
The creole wrasse was first formally described in 1801 as Brama parrae by Marcus Elieser Bloch & Johann Gottlob Schneider. In 1829 Georges Cuvier described a species and a new genus which he named Clepticus genizara, this name was later regarded as a synonym of Bloch and Schneider's earlier name and this species is the type species of the genus Clepticus.

References

External links
http://www.marinespecies.org/aphia.php?p=taxdetails&id=280214
 

creole wrasse
Fish of the Caribbean
Fish of the Dominican Republic
creole wrasse